Caterina Marianna Percoto (19 February 1812 – 15 August 1887 in Manzano, Friuli) was an Italian writer, best remembered for her short stories and fables in Friulian, most notably her collection of Friulian fables titled Racconti (1863).

References 

1812 births
1887 deaths
Italian writers
19th-century Italian women writers